Isaac Brayton  (1801-1885) was an American sea captain and politician who served as a member of the Massachusetts House of Representatives, in the Ohio House of Representatives, as an Ohio state Judge, and in the Ohio Senate.

Early life
Brayton was born to Issac and Sarah in Nantucket, Massachusetts in 1801.  Brayton's father died when he was young, and he was raised by, a relative, Hezekiah Barnard.

Family life
On July 25, 1825 Brayton married Love Mitchell, the daughter of Lydia and Peleg Mitchell, Love(Love was the aunt of Maria Mitchell).  They had five children; Mary Ann, George Mitchell, Lydia Mitchell, John, and Henry Swift.

Ship's captain
In the early part of his life Brayton became the captain of a whaling ship, on April 28, 1833, Brayton landed the largest cargo of whale oil ever brought to Nantucket (2,824 barrels).  Brayton also landed one of the first, if not the first Christian missionaries to the Hawaiian Islands.

Associate judgeship
In 1850 Brayton was elected an Associate  judge by the General Assembly, which at this time elected Ohio's judges, to represent Portage County on Ohio's Ninth Judicial Circuit.

Notes

1801 births
Members of the Massachusetts House of Representatives
Members of the Ohio House of Representatives
Ohio state senators
Sea captains
People from Nantucket, Massachusetts
People from Ravenna, Ohio
1885 deaths
19th-century American politicians